Chelonoidis niger (the Galápagos tortoise) is a tortoise species endemic to the Galápagos Islands. It includes at least 14, and possibly up to 16, subspecies. Only 12 subspecies now exist: one on each of the islands of Santiago, San Cristóbal, Pinzón, Española, and Fernandina; two on Santa Cruz; one on each of the five main volcanoes of the largest island, Isabela (Wolf, Darwin, Alcedo, Sierra Negra, and Cerro Azul); and one, abingdoni from Pinta Island, which is considered extinct as of June 24, 2012. The subspecies inhabiting Floreana Island (Chelonoidis niger) is thought to have been hunted to extinction by 1850, only years after Charles Darwin's landmark visit of 1835 in which he saw carapaces but no live tortoises on the island; however, hybrid tortoises with C. n. niger ancestry still exist in the modern day.

Biological taxonomy is not fixed, and placement of taxa is reviewed as a result of new research. The current categorization of subspecies of Chelonoidis niger is shown below. Also included are synonyms, which are now discarded duplicate or incorrect namings. Common names are given but may vary, as they have no set meaning.

Prior to the 2000s, all members of this group were classified as subspecies in a single species, Chelonoidis niger. From the 2000s until 2021, the individual subspecies were instead classified as distinct species. However, a 2021 study analyzing the level of divergence within the extinct West Indian Chelonoidis radiation and comparing it to the Galápagos radiation found that the level of divergence within both clades may have been significantly overestimated, and supported once again reclassifying all Galápagos tortoises as subspecies of a single subspecies, C. niger. This was followed by the Turtle Taxonomy Working Group and the Reptile Database later that year.



List of subspecies

Disputed subspecies

References

Galapagos tortoise